The Complete Miles Davis at Montreux is a 2002 box set of 20 CDs comprising the 11 appearances by Miles Davis at the Montreux Jazz Festival between 1973 and 1991.

Track listing

Disc 1
1. 	"Miles in Montreux 73, part 1" [Turnaroundphrase] July 8, 1973 	16:35
2. 	"Miles in Montreux 73, part 2" [Tune in 5] July 8, 1973 	19:53
Disc 2
1. 	"Ife" (Miles Davis) July 8, 1973 	27:23
2. 	"Calypso Frelimo" (Davis) July 8, 1973 	16:00
3. 	"Miles in Montreux 73, part 3" [Unknown 730620] July 8, 1973 	14:51
Disc 3
1. 	"Speak/That's What Happened" (Davis/John Scofield) July 8, 1984 	11:43
2. 	"New Blues" (Davis) July 8, 1984 	8:41
3. 	"What It Is" (Davis, John Scofield) July 8, 1984 	8:05
4. 	"It Gets Better" (Davis) July 8, 1984 	13:46
5. 	"Something on Your Mind" (Hubert Eaves III, James Williams) July 8, 1984 	11:10
Disc 4
1. 	"Time After Time" (Cyndi Lauper, Rob Hyman) July 8, 1984 	13:56
2. 	"Hopscotch" (Marcus Miller) July 8, 1984 	7:11
3. 	"Bass Solo" July 8, 1984 	1:26
4. 	"Jean Pierre" (Davis) July 8, 1984 	10:07
5. 	"Lake Geneva" (Davis) July 8, 1984 	4:20
6. 	"Something on Your Mind" (Hubert Eaves III, James Williams) [Reprise] July 8, 1984 	7:31
Disc 5
1. 	"Speak/That's What Happened" (Davis, John Scofield) July 8, 1984 	8:29
2. 	"New Blues" (Davis) July 8, 1984 	9:06
3. 	"What It Is" (Davis, John Scofield) July 8, 1984 	9:21
4. 	"It Gets Better" (Davis) July 8, 1984 	13:30
5. 	"Something on Your Mind" (Hubert Eaves III, James Williams) July 8, 1984 	13:00
Disc 6
1. 	"Time After Time" (Cyndi Lauper, Rob Hyman) July 8, 1984 	12:08
2. 	"Hopscotch" (Marcus Miller) July 8, 1984 	8:09
3. 	"Bass Solo" July 8, 1984 	1:53
4. 	"Jean Pierre" (Davis) July 8, 1984 	10:31
5. 	"Lake Geneva" (Davis) July 8, 1984 	3:16
6. 	"Something on Your Mind" (Hubert Eaves III, James Williams) [Reprise] July 8, 1984 	10:45
7. 	"Code M.D." (Robert Irving III) July 8, 1984 	6:51
Disc 7
1. 	"One Phone Call/Street Scenes/That's What Happened" (Davis, John Scofield) July 14, 1985 	13:27
2. 	"New Blues" (Davis) July 14, 1985 	6:39
3. 	"Maze" (Davis, Erin Davis, Randy Hall, Zane Giles) July 14, 1985 	9:55
4. 	"Human Nature" (Steve Porcaro, John Bettis) July 14, 1985 	5:31
5. 	"MD 1/Something on Your Mind/MD 2" (Davis, Hubert Eaves III, James Williams) July 14, 1985 	13:24
6. 	"Time After Time" (Cyndi Lauper, Rob Hyman) July 14, 1985 	8:18
7. 	"Ms. Morrisine" (Morrisine Tynes Irving, Davis, Robert Irving III) July 14, 1985 	10:36
Disc 8
1. 	"Code M.D." (Robert Irving III) July 14, 1985 	8:01
2. 	"Pacific Express" (John McLaughlin) July 14, 1985 	14:46
3. 	"Katia" (Robert Irving III) July 14, 1985 	7:07
4. 	"Hopscotch" (Marcus Miller) July 14, 1985 	5:55
5. 	"You're Under Arrest" (John Scofield) July 14, 1985 	6:38
6. 	"Jean Pierre/You're Under Arrest/Then There Were None" (Davis, John Scofield) July 14, 1985 	9:04
7. 	"Decoy" (Robert Irving III) July 14, 1985 	4:13
Disc 9
1. 	"One Phone Call/Street Scenes/That's What Happened" (Davis, John Scofield) July 14, 1985 	14:06
2. 	"New Blues" (Davis) July 14, 1985 	6:16
3. 	"Maze" (Davis, Erin Davis, Randy Hall, Zane Giles) July 14, 1985 	10:05
4. 	"Human Nature" (Steve Porcaro, John Bettis) July 14, 1985 	7:37
5. 	"MD 1/Something on Your Mind/MD 2" (Davis, Hubert Eaves III, James Williams) July 14, 1985 	13:24
6. 	"Time After Time" (Cyndi Lauper, Rob Hyman) July 14, 1985 	11:07
Disc 10
1. 	"Ms. Morrisine" (Morrisine Tynes Irving, Davis, Robert Irving III) July 14, 1985 	10:12
2. 	"Code M.D." (Robert Irving III) July 14, 1985 	8:10
3. 	"Pacific Express" (John McLaughlin) July 14, 1985 	15:25
4. 	"Katia" (Robert Irving III) July 14, 1985 	8:15
5. 	"Hopscotch" (Marcus Miller) July 14, 1985 	7:41
6. 	"You're Under Arrest" (John Scofield) July 14, 1985 	7:16
7. 	"Jean Pierre/You're Under Arrest/Then There Were None" (Davis, John Scofield) July 14, 1985 	8:43
8. 	"Decoy" (Robert Irving III) July 14, 1985 	5:04
Disc 11
1. 	"One Phone Call/Street Scenes/That's What Happened" (Davis, John Scofield) July 17, 1986 	9:08
2. 	"New Blues" (Davis) July 17, 1986 	5:55
3. 	"Maze" (Davis, Erin Davis, Randy Hall, Zane Giles) July 17, 1986 	10:20
4. 	"Human Nature" (Steve Porcaro, John Bettis) July 17, 1986 	8:36
5. 	"Wrinkle" (Davis, Erin Davis, Randy Hall, Zane Giles, Wayne Linsey) July 17, 1986 	10:55
6. 	"Tutu" (Marcus Miller) July 17, 1986 	6:53
7. 	"Splatch" (Marcus Miller) July 17, 1986 	11:16
Disc 12
1. 	"Time After Time" (Cyndi Lauper, Rob Hyman) July 17, 1986 	8:32
2. 	"Al Jarreau" (Davis) July 17, 1986 	6:23
3. 	"Carnival Time" (Neil Larsen) July 17, 1986 	4:27
4. 	"Burn" (Robert Irving III, Randy Hall) July 17, 1986 	8:26
5. 	"Portia" (Marcus Miller) July 17, 1986 	7:22
6. 	"Jean Pierre" (Davis) July 17, 1986 	9:35
Disc 13
1. 	"In a Silent Way" (Joe Zawinul) July 7, 1988 	1:04
2. 	"Intruder" (Davis) July 7, 1988 	4:54
3. 	"New Blues" (Davis) July 7, 1988 	7:07
4. 	"Perfect Way" (Green Gartside, David Gamson) July 7, 1988 	4:50
5. 	"The Senate/Me and You" (Joseph "Foley" McCreary) July 7, 1988 	9:20
6. 	"Human Nature" (Steve Porcaro, John Bettis) July 7, 1988 	13:01
7. 	"Wrinkle" (Davis, Erin Davis, Randy Hall, Zane Giles, Wayne Linsey) July 7, 1988 	8:15
8. 	"Tutu" (Marcus Miller) July 7, 1988 	11:05
9. 	"Time After Time" (Cyndi Lauper, Rob Hyman) July 7, 1988 	8:11
Disc 14
1. 	"Movie Star" (Prince Rogers Nelson) July 7, 1988 	4:27
2. 	"Splatch" (Marcus Miller) July 7, 1988 	9:22
3. 	"Heavy Metal Prelude" (Davis) July 7, 1988 	5:23
4. 	"Heavy Metal" (Davis) July 7, 1988 	6:25
5. 	"Don't Stop Me Now" (Steve Lukather, David Paitch) July 7, 1988 	7:19
6. 	"Carnival Time" (Neil Larsen) July 7, 1988 	13:19
7. 	"Jean Pierre" (Davis) July 7, 1988 	8:50
8. 	"Tomaas" (Davis, Marcus Miller) July 7, 1988 	11:08
Disc 15
1. 	"Intruder" (Davis) July 21, 1989 	5:47
2. 	"New Blues" (Davis) July 21, 1989 	12:08
3. 	"Perfect Way" (Green Gartside, David Gamson) July 21, 1989 	6:35
4. 	"Hannibal" (Marcus Miller) July 21, 1989 	10:43
5. 	"Human Nature" (Steve Porcaro, John Bettis) July 21, 1989 	10:50
6. 	"Mr. Pastorius" (Marcus Miller) July 21, 1989 	4:31
7. 	"Tutu" (Marcus Miller) July 21, 1989 	13:29
Disc 16
1. 	"Jilli" (John Bigham) July 21, 1989 	5:56
2. 	"Time After Time" (Cyndi Lauper, Rob Hyman) July 21, 1989 	10:46
3. 	"Jo Jo" (Marcus Miller) July 21, 1989 	5:35
4. 	"Amandla" (Davis) July 21, 1989 	5:16
5. 	"The Senate/Me and You" (J. McCreary) July 21, 1989 	11:47
6. 	"Wrinkle" (Davis, Erin Davis, Randy Hall, Zane Giles, Wayne Linsey) July 21, 1989 	6:50
7. 	"Portia" (Marcus Miller) July 21, 1989 	7:47
Disc 17
1. 	"Perfect Way" (Green Gartside, David Gamson) July 20, 1990 	6:00
2. 	"New Blues" (Davis) July 20, 1990 	8:31
3. 	"Hannibal" (Marcus Miller) July 20, 1990 	10:44
4. 	"The Senate/Me and You" (J. McCreary) July 20, 1990 	10:51
5. 	"In the Night" (Larry Blackmon, Merv De Peyer) July 20, 1990 	3:15
6. 	"Human Nature" (Steve Porcaro, John Bettis) July 20, 1990 	12:48
7. 	"Time After Time" (Cyndi Lauper, Rob Hyman) July 20, 1990 	9:13
Disc 18
1. 	"Wrinkle" (Davis, Erin Davis, Randy Hall, Zane Giles, Wayne Linsey) July 20, 1990 	8:10
2. 	"Tutu" (Marcus Miller) July 20, 1990 	13:31
3. 	"Don't Stop Me Now" (Steve Lukather, David Paitch) July 20, 1990 	11:22
4. 	"Carnival Time" (Neil Larsen) July 20, 1990 	13:38
Disc 19
1. 	"Introduction" [Claude Nobs, Quincy Jones] July 8, 1991 	1:22
2. 	"Boplicity" (Davis, Gil Evans) July 8, 1991 	3:40
3. 	"Springsville" (John Carisi) [with introduction] July 8, 1991 	3:42
4. 	"The Maids of Cadiz" (Leo Delibes) July 8, 1991 	3:36
5. 	"The Duke" (Dave Brubeck) July 8, 1991 	4:00
6. 	"My Ship" (Kurt Weill, Ira Gershwin) July 8, 1991 	4:10
7. 	"Miles Ahead" (Davis, Gil Evans) July 8, 1991 	3:38
8. 	"Blues for Pablo" (Gil Evans) July 8, 1991 	6:00
9. 	"Introduction" [Quincy Jones] July 8, 1991 	0:27
10. 	"Gone" (Gil Evans) July 8, 1991 	4:10
11. 	"Gone, Gone, Gone" (Dubose Heyward, George Gershwin, Ira Gershwin) July 8, 1991 	1:47
12. 	"Summertime" (George Gershwin, Ira Gershwin, Dubose Heyward) July 8, 1991 	2:54
13. 	"Here Come de Honey Man" (Dubose Heyward, George Gershwin, Ira Gershwin) July 8, 1991 	3:40
14. 	"The Pan Piper" (Gil Evans) July 8, 1991 	1:40
15. 	"Solea" (Gil Evans) July 8, 1991 	11:37
Disc 20
1. 	"Perfect Way" (Green Gartside, David Gamson) July 17, 1991 	5:34
2. 	"New Blues" (Davis) July 17, 1991 	15:37
3. 	"Hannibal" (Marcus Miller) July 17, 1991 	17:41
4. 	"Human Nature" (Steve Porcaro, John Bettis) July 17, 1991 	16:57
5. 	"Time After Time" (Cyndi Lauper, Rob Hyman) July 17, 1991 	9:47
6. 	"Wrinkle" (Davis, Erin Davis, Randy Hall, Zane Giles, Wayne Linsey) July 17, 1991 	4:22

References

External links
 Discography entry at Miles Ahead: A Miles Davis Website

Miles Davis live albums
Albums recorded at the Montreux Jazz Festival
2002 live albums
2002 compilation albums
Columbia Records compilation albums
Columbia Records live albums